Bruno Ferreira Melo  (born 26 October 1992), known as Bruno Melo, is a Brazilian professional footballer who plays as a left back for Goiás, on loan from Fortaleza.

Club career

Fortaleza

Loan stints
Born in Paracuru, Ceará, Bruno was a Fortaleza youth graduate. For the 2011 season, he was loaned to Maracanã, and made his senior debut on 7 April of that year by starting in a 1–0 home win against Associação Desportiva São Benedito for the Campeonato Cearense Segunda Divisão championship.

After his loan expired, Bruno returned to Fortaleza and was assigned to the under-20 squad. Ahead of the 2012 campaign, he moved to Quixadá also in a temporary deal; on his debut on 10 March, he scored his team's second in a 2–1 away win against Limoeiro.

In 2014, he served loans at Quixadá,  and Uniclinic, winning the third division of the Cearense with the latter.

Breakthrough
Returning to Leão, Bruno made his debut for the club on 14 January 2015, starting in a 0–0 away draw against former side Quixadá for the year's Cearense. A backup for his first two seasons, he only started to appear regularly from the 2017 season onwards.

Bruno scored his first goals for Fortaleza on 4 March 2017, netting a brace in a 5–0 home routing of Itapipoca, also for the state league. He was also an undisputed starter for the year's Série C, contributing with six goals as his side returned to Série B after a nine-year absence; highlights included doubles in a 2–0 away win against Botafogo-PB and in a 2–2 draw at Sampaio Corrêa.

On 30 November 2017, Bruno renewed his contract until 2020. He made his debut in the second division the following 14 April, starting in a 2–1 home defeat of Guarani.

Bruno scored his first Série B goal on 18 April 2018, netting the opener through a penalty kick in a 2–0 away win against Boa Esporte. He finished the campaign with 30 appearances, all as a starter, and contributed with seven goals as his side achieved promotion to the Série A.

Career statistics

Honours
Fortaleza
Campeonato Brasileiro Série B: 2018
Campeonato Cearense: 2015, 2016, 2019, 2020, 2021
Copa do Nordeste: 2019
: 2016, 2017

Uniclinic
Campeonato Cearense Terceira Divisão: 2014

References

External links

1992 births
Living people
Sportspeople from Ceará
Brazilian footballers
Association football defenders
Campeonato Brasileiro Série A players
Campeonato Brasileiro Série B players
Campeonato Brasileiro Série C players
Fortaleza Esporte Clube players
FC Atlético Cearense players
Sport Club Corinthians Paulista players